Veyras may refer to:
 Veyras, Switzerland, a municipality in the canton of Valais
 Veyras, Ardèche, a commune in France